Atopetholus is a genus of millipedes in the family Atopetholidae. There are about eight described species in Atopetholus.

Species
These eight species belong to the genus Atopetholus:
 Atopetholus angelus Chamberlin, 1920
 Atopetholus barbaranus Chamberlin, 1949
 Atopetholus californicus Chamberlin, 1918
 Atopetholus carmelitus Chamberlin, 1940
 Atopetholus fraternus Chamberlin, 1918
 Atopetholus michelbacheri (Verhoeff, 1938)
 Atopetholus paroicus Chamberlin, 1941
 Atopetholus pearcei Chamberlin, 1950

References

Further reading

 
 

Spirobolida
Articles created by Qbugbot